Shreya Shanker is an Indian model and beauty pageant titleholder who was crowned Femina Miss India United Continents 2019 at the grand finale of Femina Miss India 2019 by the outgoing titleholder Gayatri Bharadwaj. Her father is a serving Brigadier in the Indian Army and her mother is a freelance counsellor. She is the grand daughter of Dr R. S. P. Verma, an eminent Dermatologist of Bihar and on the maternal side, her grand father, Prof Rana Pratap Sinha, is an eminent Psychologist of Bihar. She has a younger sister, Alina, who is a studying at Delhi University. She represented India at Miss United Continents 2019 pageant, held on 28 September 2019.

Pageant history

Femina Miss India 2019
Shreya was crowned as Femina Miss India United Continents 2019 by the outgoing titleholder Gayatri Bharadwaj on 15 June 2019 at Sardar Vallabhbhai Patel Indoor Stadium, Mumbai. Previously, she was crowned as Femina Miss India Bihar 2019 on 23 April 2019.

Miss United Continents 2019
Shreya represented India at Miss United Continents 2019 pageant held on 28 September 2019 in Ecuador.

Media 
Shreya Shanker was ranked in The Times Most Desirable Women at No. 25 in 2019.

References

External links

Femina Miss India winners
Indian beauty pageant winners
Living people
Female models from Bihar
1997 births